Secret American Livingroom is the first album by the indie pop/rock band Dealership. The album was self-released by the band in 1998.

The project began as a two-song single, but it soon expanded into an eight-song EP.

After the album's release, it remained in the KALX Top 35 for eight weeks.

Track listing
All songs written by Dealership.
"Jungle Gym" – 3:26
"My Box" – 2:41
"Nerdy Girl" – 3:00
"Fallout" – 2:50
"Perfectly Happy" – 4:05
"Montserrat" – 2:21
"You're Dumb" – 5:01
"Green" – 4:21

Personnel

Dealership
Chris Groves - vocals, bass guitar
Miyuki Jane Pinckard - guitar, vocals
Chris Wetherell - drums, vocals

Production
Secret American Livingroom was produced by Dealership, recorded and mixed at Locomoto Productions by Guy Higbey. The album was mastered at Olde West by Guy Slater. Album design was by Dealership with photography by Eric Schulz and Liisa Pera.

References

Dealership (band) albums
1998 debut EPs